Anchal college is an undergraduate college under Odisha Government in the Bargarh District. This college was established in 1965. This university was earlier affiliated to Utkal University, after the establishment of Sambalpur University in 1966 it was later added to later one. This college provides education in Higher Secondary and Degree level in Arts, Science and Commerce.

History 
The college is one of the oldest college in western Odisha being established in the year 1965. This college is a fully aided educational institution of the government of Odisha, having many UGC- scale teachers. The college was credited with a "B" grade by NAAC. 
This college was early afflicted with Utkal University, till when in 1969 Sambalpur University came into existence and afflicted with the new university. 
It is present in the revenue district of Bargarh.

Department
The college provides teaching in the following courses:
Botany,
Chemistry,
Commerce,
Economics,
Education,
English,
History,
Mathematics,
Oriya (Odia language),
Philosophy,
Physics,
Political science,
Sanskrit,
Zoology, and
Information Technology.

NAAC Grade 2016
The National Assessment and Accreditation Council (NAAC) is an independent autonomous body that works under University Grants Commission (UGC) which was established in the year 1994 with its headquarters in Bengaluru. The overall work of this autonomous body is to improve the quality of education, by visiting college and providing grades it decides the condition of the institution and provides funds. According to the latest reports of Meeting of the Standing Committee, list of Institutions Recommended for Accreditation by NAAC 2nd cycle report, Anchal College had ranked Grade B with CGPA 2.21 C.G.P.A. The grading system of N.A.A.C usually lasts for 5 years and after the completion of 5 years, the NAAC team again visits the respective college for grading.

N.A.A.C grades institute with 8 grade ladder:

References

External links
 College Website

Department of Higher Education, Odisha
Universities and colleges in Odisha
Bargarh district
Colleges affiliated to Sambalpur University
1965 establishments in Orissa
Educational institutions established in 1965